Morte d'Urban is the debut novel of J. F. Powers. It was published by Doubleday in 1962. It won the 1963 National Book Award. It is still in print, having been reissued by The New York Review of Books in 2000.

The novel tells the story of Father Urban Roche, a member of a fictitious religious order named the Clementines. Fr. Urban has developed a reputation as a gifted public speaker, but is sent by the superior to a remote retreat house in rural Minnesota. There he puts his skills to work improving the facilities and the local church.

The book has been widely praised. Thomas Merton called it “a valid and penetrating study of the psychology of a priest in what is essentially a spiritual conflict.” Jonathan Yardley, in a consideration of the book in The Washington Post four decades later, praised it as “our great workplace saga,” comparing it favorably to Sinclair Lewis’s Babbitt, calling it “subtler, wittier and much more elegantly written.”

Plot summary
Based out of Chicago, Father Urban Roche is a member of the fictitious religious order, the Clementines. The Clementines, by Father Urban's estimation, are stagnating. They care little about innovation and are instead content to remain as they are. Father Urban's charismatic, energetic personality contrasts the rest of the Order. Through his charisma, he befriends a wealthy benefactor named Billy Cosgrove, who helps Fr. Urban secure new quarters for the Order. Despite Fr. Urban's charismatic spirit, he is sent to The Order of St. Clement, a failing retreat house in rural Minnesota.

At Minnesota, Fr. Urban is joined by Fr. Jack, an aging priest who was also transferred from Chicago to Minnesota. Fr. Wilfrid presides over The Order of St. Clement and is primarily concerned with completing the necessary repairs to the facility. To Fr. Urban's dismay, the property is in sorry shape, and the Order hardly has the means to repair it. True to his spirit, Fr. Urban dreams of making the retreat a better place and it is renamed St. Clement's Hill.

Fr. Urban becomes involved with the surrounding communities in the area, slowly growing a following thanks to his public speaking skills. He plays a large role in revitalizing a local parish and makes connections throughout the community, particularly with the Thwaites family. Mrs. Thwaites, an aging widow, was the previous owner of St. Clement's hill before donating the property to the Order.

Thanks to the patronage of Billy Cosgrove, Fr. Urban is able to buy property neighboring St. Clement's Hill to turn into a golf course. With this innovation, the retreat becomes more popular than ever. The Bishop, a man who Fr. Urban feels greatly competitive towards, comes to visit the golf course. The two play a game together, during which Fr. Urban is hit in the head with a golf ball. This event serves as a turning point for Fr. Urban.

Soon after this, Billy Cosgrove and Fr. Urban take a fishing trip. Billy cruelly attempts to drown a deer, an action which Fr. Urban counteracts by knocking Billy out of the boat. Angry, Billy responds in kind, pushing Fr. Urban out of the boat, stranding him. He is left on his own and has to find his own way back home. Luckily, while waiting for the bus, Mrs. Thwaites’ daughter, Sally, drives by and offers Billy a ride.

The two spend the evening together on a small island in the middle of the lake on the Thwaites’ property, drinking and talking. Sally challenges Fr. Urban to a swim, but, feeling as if their relationship was heading in an immoral direction, he refuses. Sally then goes out for a swim alone and takes the boat, leaving Fr. Urban once again stranded and forced to swim back to shore.

In terms of his career, Fr. Urban has never been more successful. He is soon elected Father Provincial and returns to Chicago. However, his health is failing and he no longer acts with the charisma and energy he once did. While he used to live to challenge the bureaucracy of the Order, he is now solidly a part of it and maintains the status quo.

Style
J. F. Powers was known for his writing about priests, but it was Morte d'Urban, his debut novel, that established his voice. Often called the greatest Catholic writer of the 20th century, Powers' priests demonstrate the balance between man and his profession. Powers' sharp wit guides the reader towards having a sense of humor about such a subject.

References

National Book Award for Fiction winning works
1962 novels
1962 American novels
Doubleday (publisher) books
Catholic novels
Novels set in Minnesota
1962 debut novels